Orgyia antiqua, the rusty tussock moth or vapourer, is a moth in the family Erebidae.

Distribution and status
O. antiqua is native to Europe, but now has a transcontinental distribution in the Palaearctic and the Nearctic regions.
The species is not on the IUCN (2007) Red List; and in the UK is considered a common resident.

Habitat
In the UK, O. antiqua may be encountered in a variety of shrub-based habitats, including gardens, parks, open woodland, fens, hedgerows, heaths. and moors.

Description

A striking dimorphism exists between the male and the female moths of this species. The male moth typically has orange- to red-brown (ochreous red and dark brown) wings; each fore wing has a white comma-shaped (tornal) spot. It has marked plumose (short, bipectinate) antennae. The wingspan measures between 35 and 38 mm. The female moth has vestigial wings and is flightless; it is light grey-brown (ochreous grey), has "shortly bipectinate" antennae, and a swollen abdomen. The compound eyes of the two sexes differ not only with regard to their size, number of facets and internal organization and ultrastructure, but also with regard to their sensitivity to ultraviolet radiation
The hairy caterpillar is spectacular, with "humps", "horns", and a "tail" in a combination of dark grey, red, and yellow.

Lifecycle

Egg
Several hundred eggs are laid on the outside of the female's empty cocoon, usually attached to a host plant or something close by (e.g. fence, wall). The species overwinters in the egg stage. Each brownish egg is rounded, somewhat flattened top and bottom. A small darker depression is seen in the upperside.

Caterpillar
The larvae hatch early in the spring, as soon as foliage starts to appear. They are easily recognized by their horn-like tufts of hair-like setae. Four toothbrush-like tufts occur along the back, and hair pencils project from the sides at the front and at the back. The body is dark grey to black, and red tubercules are along the sides and back. 

They have defensive glands at the back, and wipe their setae against them to charge them with toxins. They grow to about 30–40 mm, females being considerably larger than males. In the UK, caterpillars can be found between May and early September.

The caterpillar is a minor forest pest in North America, and may become a pest in cities in the UK.

Pupa
The pupa forms in a crevice (e.g. in tree bark or fence) inside a silk cocoon. It is glossy black and hairy.

Imago
The male flies in a zigzag pattern—often high up in search of females—and is active during the day or at night. Males occasionally come to light. In New Brunswick, adult males are attracted to pheromone traps set in commercial forests for white-marked tussock moth (O. leucostigma).

The female is flightless, spending its brief life attached to its cocoon. The female attracts other males via release of a pheromone, the males find the female via the concentration gradient of the released pheromone. The female mates and lays its grey-yellow eggs in large numbers on its fine-meshed cocoon.

The adult moths do not feed, so only live a short time. The two (sometimes three) generations fly from May till October; in North America, only one generation occurs in a year. In the UK, one protracted generation, from July to October in the south, and from September to October in the north, is believed to happen.

The males are diurnal, flying during the day, but are occasionally attracted to light.

Host plants
Caterpillars are polyphagous and feed on a wide range of deciduous trees and shrubs, such as birch (Betula), Crataegus, lime (Tilia), Prunus, Quercus, Rubus, Salix, Tamarix, Vaccinium, Aeonium haworthii or Delonix regia.

In Scotland, the species is almost always found on birch, but has also been recorded damaging Sitka spruce.

Gallery

Illustrations

References

External links

The Vapourer on UKMoths
Fauna Europaea
Lepiforum.de
JustGreen Bug of the Month (PDF) 
Good plant protection practice (PDF)

Lymantriinae
Moths described in 1758
Moths of Europe
Moths of North America
Moths of Asia
Insects of Iceland
Taxa named by Carl Linnaeus